Better Than Raw is the eighth studio album by German power metal band Helloween, released in 1998. The album spawned the singles "I Can" and "Hey Lord!".

The album was recorded at Chateau du Pape and Crazy Cat Studios in Hamburg and at Mi Sueño Studio in Tenerife. It was produced and mixed by Tommy Hansen at Chateau du Pape and mastered by Ian Cooper at Metropolis, London.

Track listing

M - 2 also appears on the "I Can" single.
M - 3,4 also appears on the "Hey Lord!" single.

Personnel

Helloween

 Andi Deris - lead and backing vocals
 Michael Weikath - guitar, backing vocals
 Roland Grapow - guitar, backing vocals
 Markus Grosskopf - bass, backing vocals
 Uli Kusch - drums, backing vocals

Others

 Jorn Ellerbrock - keyboards
 Tommy Hansen (producer) - keyboards
 Jutta Weinhold, Ralf Maurer, Christina Hahne - backing vocals

Trivia
Hanson have been known to use the album introduction as an entrance to their concerts.
Laudate Dominum was written as a tribute for the band's dedicated fans in Spain, South America and other Christians countries.
Midnight Sun is about the ending of a bad relationship.
The cover was inspired by The Smurfs, with Gargamel changed for the witch and the Smurfs for pumpkins.
As opposed to the more benign-looking pumpkin used on previous albums, a sinister-looking pumpkin is used to represent the "o" in the "Helloween" logo.  Albeit with a few minor tweaks, it was in use up until Helloween.

Charts

Certifications

References

External links 
 Helloween - Better Than Raw (1998) - Poster (Hi Res Scan)

Helloween albums
1998 albums